Barry Dennen (February 22, 1938 – September 26, 2017) was an American actor, singer, and writer. He played Pontius Pilate on the original recording and later in the film of Jesus Christ Superstar.

Life and career
Dennen was born in Chicago, Illinois in February 22, 1938. His brother is Lyle Dennen.

In New York City from 1960 to 1961, he had a relationship with Barbra Streisand. They lived together for a year, during which time he helped her develop the nightclub act that began her successful career as a singer and actress.

He moved to London for 15 years and in 1968 landed the starring role of the master of ceremonies in the London version of Cabaret. In 1970, he played Pontius Pilate on the album of Jesus Christ Superstar, and he played the same role in the Broadway production (1971). In the same year, he played Mendel in Norman Jewison's film of Fiddler on the Roof. According to Dennen's website, he suggested to Jewison that he direct a film version of Jesus Christ Superstar. Jewison did so, and Dennen played Pilate again (1973).

Dennen also played a variety of small parts on American television shows including: Batman, Wonder Woman, Galtar and the Golden Lance, Tales from the Darkside and Justice League: Throne of Atlantis, and films, such as Madhouse (1974), Brannigan (1975), The Kentucky Fried Movie (1977), The Shining (1980), Ragtime (1981), Trading Places (1983), Superman III (1983), Twin Sitters (1994) and Titanic (1997). He also played auto dealer Irwin Lapsey in Shock Treatment (1981). In 1982, Dennen played the role of Buddy in the TV adaptation of Beau Geste.

Dennen also ventured into voice acting. He portrayed the Chamberlain SkekSil in The Dark Crystal (1982) as well as Tulku in The Shadow (1994). He also did voice work on cartoons such as DuckTales, Batman: The Animated Series, The Pirates of Dark Water, Animaniacs, Avatar: The Last Airbender and Star Wars: The Clone Wars. He also did voices for many video games, including Fatman in Metal Gear Solid 2: Sons of Liberty, Master Li in Jade Empire, Police Chief Bogen in Grim Fandango, Mimir in the video game Too Human, Dean Domino in Fallout: New Vegas expansion "Dead Money", The Dark One in The Mark of Kri, the Kangxi Emperor in Age of Empires III: The Asian Dynasties, Benedict Burgess Batteric III in Infinity Blade III, Chaos Knight, Phantom Lancer, and Rubick in Dota 2, and the venerable Odo and meister Glimmerheim in Dungeon Siege III.

In 1984, Dennen wrote the lyrics for the children's musical revue Wanna Play?!, which was produced in Kansas City and later produced on television twice. The show, written with writer Linda Bergman and composer Jeff Rizzo, is licensed by Samuel French. He wrote the screenplay for an episode of Amazing Stories titled "The Secret Cinema" (1985) and cowrote an episode of The Comic Strip Presents... titled "Demonella" (1993). His autobiographical book My Life With Barbra: A Love Story (1997) deals with their relationship and with his gradual realization that he was gay.

In June 2017, Dennen suffered a fall in his home in Burbank, California and required hospital care. He never fully recovered and died on September 26.

Filmography

References

External links
 
 
 Barry Dennen at Find a Grave

1938 births
2017 deaths
Male actors from Chicago
American male film actors
American memoirists
American male musical theatre actors
American male screenwriters
American male voice actors
Burials at Hollywood Forever Cemetery
Deaths from falls
American gay actors
American gay writers
LGBT people from Illinois
American male non-fiction writers
Screenwriters from Illinois
21st-century American LGBT people